Abdallah Yaisien (، born 23 May 1994) is a French professional footballer who plays for Al Mokawloon in the Egyptian Premier League.

Early life
Born April 23, 1994 in Bondy, France, to an Egyptian father who is a football fanatic who roots for Al Ahly of Egypt and an Algerian mother. His  younger brother Omar Yaisien is an Egypt U20 player.

Career
Abdallah Yaisien started his career playing at youth team level with Paris Saint-Germain. At only 16 years old Abdallah signed his first professional contract with the team of Paris Saint Germain. He quickly integrated Carlo Ancelotti's group.

In 2011 he participated to the World Cup in Mexico with the U17 French team. France finally reached the quarter finals of the tournament.

Hailed as a promising youngster, he was then signed by Serie A club Bologna during the 2013 summer market but was never featured in the first team and was successively loaned out to Serie B club Trapani in January 2014, where he made only three appearances in the second half of the 2013–14 season.

On 23 January 2015, he accepted a loan deal to Lega Pro club Arezzo until the end of the season. He was successively released by Bologna at the end of the season.

He signed for FC Lorient in January 2016, being mostly featured with the reserve team.

During season 2016/2017 Abdallah Yaisien played 12  games in the CFA French national league. He scored 7 goals and gave 5 assists.

In July 2017, Yaisien signed a two-year professional contract with Paris Saint-Germain. He left the club at the end of the 2018/19 season.

International career
A youth international for France, Yaisisen declared an interest in representing the Egypt national football team.-

References

External links
 
 
 

1994 births
Living people
Sportspeople from Bondy
French footballers
France youth international footballers
French people of Egyptian descent
French sportspeople of Algerian descent
French expatriate footballers
Expatriate footballers in Italy
French expatriate sportspeople in Italy
Serie B players
Serie C players
Championnat National 2 players
Bologna F.C. 1909 players
Trapani Calcio players
S.S. Arezzo players
Association football midfielders
Footballers from Seine-Saint-Denis